Richland may refer to the following places in the U.S. state of Mississippi:

 Richland, Mississippi, a city in Rankin County, Mississippi
 Richland, Holmes County, Mississippi, an unincorporated community in Holmes County, Mississippi

See also
Richland (disambiguation)
Richland, a historic place in Church Hill, Mississippi